Rabiranjan Chattopadhyay (30 September 1940 – 2 November 2021) was an Indian politician and the erstwhile Minister for the departments of Technical Education and Training, Science and Technology and Biotechnology in the Government of West Bengal. He was also an MLA, elected from the Bardhaman Dakshin constituency in the 2011 West Bengal state assembly election.

He was re-elected again in the 2016 West Bengal Legislative Assembly election.

References 

1940 births
2021 deaths
State cabinet ministers of West Bengal
Trinamool Congress politicians from West Bengal
People from Purba Bardhaman district